The Maveli Express is a daily night express train of the Southern Railway Division of Indian Railways connecting Mangalore Central to Trivandrum Central. The train numbers are 16603 and 16604.

About the Train
This train is named after the Maveli, an alias of the ruler Kerala in the mythology of Mahabali. The train runs via the coastal railway route of Alleppey.

Traction
It is hauled by an Erode based  WAP-4 or Royapuram based WAP-7 electric locomotive on its entire journey.

Coach composition

It has 23 coaches (10 sleeper class, 4 3-tier AC , 1 2-tier AC, 1 AC first class-cum-2-tier, 5 second class, and 2 brake van-cum-second sitter).

Stops

Mangalore Central
Kasaragod
Kanhangad
Nileshwar
Cheruvathur
Payyanur
Pazhayangadi
Kannur
Thalassery
Mahe
Vatakara
Koyilandy
Kozhikkode
Tirur
Kuttippuram
Shoranur Junction

Aluva
Ernakulam Junction
Thuravoor
Cherthala
Mararikulam
Alappuzha
Ambalapuzha
Haripad
Kayamkulam Junction
Karunagapally
Quilon Junction

Varkala
Trivandrum Central

References

Transport in Mangalore
Transport in Thiruvananthapuram
Named passenger trains of India
Rail transport in Kerala
Express trains in India